Manic D Press is an American literary press based in San Francisco, California publishing fiction (novels and short stories), poetry, cultural studies, art, narrative-oriented comix, children's books, and alternative travel trade paperbacks. It was founded by Jennifer Joseph in 1984, as an alternative outlet for young writers seeking to bring their work into print, and since its founding has expanded its mission to include writers of all ages. Manic D books have been translated into more than a dozen languages, including Russian, Japanese, Polish, Danish, Korean, and Hebrew.

Distributors

Manic D Press books are distributed to the trade throughout the US by Consortium and wholesalers including AK Press, Microcosm Publishing, Bookazine, Ingram, and Baker & Taylor; in the UK and EU by Turnaround PSL; in Canada by Publishers Group Canada; and throughout the world by Ingram.

Awards

Awards presented to Manic D Press include:
1998 American Institute of Graphic Arts juried traveling exhibition 50 Books, 50 Covers
1997 Firecracker Alternative Book Award for Art
2000 American Library Association GLBT Award for Literature
2002 and 2000 Firecracker Alternative Book Awards for Fiction
Sept/Oct 2003 and March/April 2004 Booksense 76 lists
San Francisco Bay Guardian's Best of the Bay 2004: 'Best Quintessentially San Franciscan Publisher'.
2007 Publishing Triangle's Thom Gunn Award for Poetry ("Gutted" by Justin Chin)
2008 Publishing Triangle's Edmund White Award for Debut Fiction ("Dahlia Season" by Myriam Gurba)
SF Weekly's Best of San Francisco 2008: "Best Small Press"
2009 Lambda Literary Award for Transgender Writing ("Intersex (For Lack of a Better Word)" by Thea Hillman)
2010 Lambda Literary Award for Transgender Writing ("Lynnee Breedlove's One Freak Show" by Lynn Breedlove)

References

External links

Book publishing companies based in the San Francisco Bay Area
Comic book publishing companies of the United States
Companies based in San Francisco
Publishing companies of the United States
Small press publishing companies
Publishing companies established in 1984
Literary publishing companies